Blau's Four Mile House, also known as the Reitman House, is a historic property located on Four Mile Road in Camp Springs, Kentucky, a rural area of Campbell County, Kentucky. The house was constructed by Nicholas Reitman as part of a settlement built by German immigrants in the mid-19th Century. The structure was added to the United States National Register of Historic Places in 1983.

It is a -story rubble limestone house built into a hillside.

References

National Register of Historic Places in Campbell County, Kentucky
Houses in Campbell County, Kentucky
Houses on the National Register of Historic Places in Kentucky
German-American culture in Kentucky